Monte Vista High School may refer to:

Monte Vista High School (Danville, California)
Monte Vista High School (Spring Valley, California)
Monte Vista Christian School, Watsonville, California
Monte Vista High School in Whittier, California, from 1964 to 1979
Monte Vista High School (Colorado)

See also
 Monta Vista High School in Cupertino, California